Disney's All-Star Music Resort is a resort that is part of the Walt Disney World Resort. It is one of five resorts in the Value Resort category, along with Disney's All-Star Sports Resort, Disney's All-Star Movies Resort, Disney's Pop Century Resort, and Disney's Art of Animation Resort. The resort is located on the southern portion of the Walt Disney World Resort property near Disney's Animal Kingdom. Disney's All-Star Music Resort is a 1,604-room hotel featuring giant icons that pay homage to classic music genres—including Broadway show tunes, calypso, country, jazz, and rock n' roll. It was the first Disney Value Resort to feature family suites. As a characteristic with all Disney Value resorts, the resort features a music theme with giant novelty items such as guitars, trumpets, and drums. The resort is designated as part of the Florida Green Lodging Program.

The groundbreaking for the All-Star Resort complex was in November 1992. The architect of the resort was Arquitectonica of Miami. All Star Music was the second All-Star Resort to open after Disney's All-Star Sports Resort. Calypso was the first building to open on November 22, 1994, and Broadway was the last to open on February 17, 1995. The resort opened on November 22, 1994.

References

External links
 

Hotel buildings completed in 1994
Hotels in Walt Disney World Resort
Hotels established in 1994
1994 establishments in Florida